The Closure of Prisons Order 2014 is a statutory instrument of the Parliament of the United Kingdom. The order closed several prisons in England.

Provisions
The provisions of the order include:
Closing HM Prison Blundeston in Suffolk, HM Prison Dorchester in Dorset, HM Prison and Young Offender Institution Northallerton in North Yorkshire, HM Prison and Young Offender Institution Reading in Berkshire and HM Prison The Verne in Dorset.
Special reasons were given for the closure of HM Prison Reading and HM Prison Northallerton as is required when the only prison in a county is closed under the Prison Act 1952. Both prisons were deemed too small and limited in their infrastructure to keep open and that their closing would not have an adverse effect on the operation of the prison system in their respective counties.

References

Prisons in the United Kingdom
Law of the United Kingdom
2014 in British law
Statutory Instruments of the United Kingdom